Dawodiya is a village in Kurdistan Region, Iraq in the province of Dohuk. Gara Mount bounds the Sapna valley to south and Matean Mount to the north. The village lies a short distance southwest of Amadiya airport. The village is populated by Assyrians.

Etymology 
The village is believed to be named after the Mar Daudo monastery which is located north of Dawodiya.

History 
In 1850 there were 30 - 45 Chaldean Catholic families living in Dawodiya. By 1913 the population of the village had grown to 300 individuals. In 1961 approximately 150 families lived in the village.

Some references indicate that the village of Dawodiya existed in pre-Christian times while others suggest that it was built in the Middle Ages. While residents of Dawodiya are not certain of the village's exact age, they assume it was several centuries ago when some Assyrian Christian families escaped the persecution of Ottoman authorities during their original occupation of Bohtan in southern Turkey. The village was demolished in 1987 during the Anfal campaign by the regime of Saddam Hussein. The church of the village was also destroyed along with the village during the Anfal campaign.

The British scholar Austen Henry Layard visited the village in the 1840s, spending one night there. In his writings he mentions that there were 200 families living in the village, a police station and a church. Layard also notes that Catholicism replaced the original denomination of those people who were the followers of the Assyrian Church of the East. The village has a church dedicated to St John the Baptist which was originally built in the seventeenth century but was later rebuilt due to its destruction in 1987. The Anfal genocide also led to the damage of a shrine dedicated to Mart  Shmuni. In 2004 Kurds from neighbouring villages stole agricultural lands and pastures from the villagers of Dawodiya.

See also 

 List of Assyrian villages
 Dohuk

References

Populated places in Dohuk Province
Assyrian communities in Iraq